Harry Åkerfelt (4 April 1915, Tvärminne – 21 July 2008) was a Finnish sprint canoeist who competed in the late 1940s. He finished sixth in the K-1 1000 m event at the 1948 Summer Olympics in London.

External links
 Harry Åkerfelt's profile at Sports Reference.com
 Notice of Harry Åkerfelt's death

1915 births
2008 deaths
People from Hanko
Canoeists at the 1948 Summer Olympics
Finnish male canoeists
Olympic canoeists of Finland
Sportspeople from Uusimaa